The 2006–07 Egyptian Premier League started on 3 August 2006, and the season ended on 25 May 2007. Al Ahly were crowned champions for the third year in a row and for the thirty-second time in total since the league start in 1948.

Clubs 

 Al Ahly
 Al-Aluminium
 Asmant Suez
 Baladeyet Al-Mahalla
 ENPPI
 Ghazl Al Mehalla
 El-Jaish
 Haras El Hodood
 Al Ismaili
 Al Itthad Al Sakandary
 Al Masry
 Al Mokawloon
 Itesalat
 Petrojet
 Tersana
 Al Zamalek

Stadiums 

Borg El Arab Stadium in Alexandria opened recently and it will be the home of majority of the Alexandria clubs. The stadium has a capacity of 80,000. In 2007, Damanhour Stadium in the city of Damanhour will go into construction. Its capacity will be 60,000. In 2009, Mubarak International Stadium will go into construction in Six October City & its capacity will be 65,000. In 2009 the Cairo Military Academy Stadium will be rebuilt and its capacity will be 65,000. As well Ismailia has future plans for expansion or a new venue with a capacity of a minimum of 45,000.

Final league table 

 Top 2 qualify to CAF African Champions League.
 Egyptian Cup winner & 3rd place qualify to CAF Cup.

Top goal scorers 

0
Egyptian Premier League, 2006-07
Premier